Elsdon may be a given name, a surname, or a place name.

The surname derives originally from a place name (in Northumberland, England) with the meaning in Old English of Elli's valley.

Given name 
 Thomas Elsdon Ashford, British recipient of the Victoria Cross
 Elsdon Best, New Zealand ethnographer
 Janet Elsdon Mackey, New Zealand politician
 Elsdon Storey, Australian neurologist

Surname 
 Lord Elsdon, judge, early nineteenth century
 Alan Elsdon (1934-2016), jazz musician
 William Elsdon ( 1829 – 1904), Australian railway engineer

Place name 
In New Zealand:
 Elsdon, New Zealand a suburb of Porirua
In the United Kingdom: 
 Elsdon, Herefordshire
 Elsdon, Northumberland
In the United States: 
West Elsdon, Chicago

Other uses of Elsdon 
 The Elsdon murder, an instructive tale in Baden-Powell's Scouting for Boys
 The Elsdon Reel, a Northumberland traditional dance

de:Elsdon